Guarda may refer to:

 Guarda, Portugal, city in Portugal
 Guarda District, the district containing that city
 Roman Catholic Diocese of Guarda, Portugal, the diocese containing that city
 Guarda, Switzerland, municipality in Grisons, Switzerland
 Guarda railway station, a Rhaetian Railway station
 Guarda Veneta, municipality in the province of Rovigo, region of Veneto, Italy
 A Guarda, municipality in the province of Pontevedra, Galicia, Spain
 Guarda-Mor, municipality in Minas Gerais, Brazil

See also
Garda (disambiguation)
Guard (disambiguation)
Guardia (disambiguation)
Guardian (disambiguation)
La Guardia (disambiguation)